Cosmetic electrotherapy is a range of beauty treatments that uses low electric currents passed through the skin to produce several therapeutic effects such as muscle toning in the body and micro-lifting of the face. It is based on electrotherapy, which has been researched and accepted in the field of rehabilitation, though the "scientific and medical communities have tended to sideline or dismiss the use of electrotherapy for healthy muscles".

The use of electricity in cosmetics goes back to the end of the 19th century, almost a hundred years after Luigi Galvani discovered that electricity can make the muscle in a frog's leg twitch (see galvanism). Subsequent research in electrophysiology has been carried out by people such as Robert O. Becker, Dr Björn Nordenström, a former chair of the Nobel Selection Committee for Medicine, and Dr Thomas Wing, who invented some of the first micro-current devices.

Treatments

There are four main types of treatment, that differ in the type of current they use (see Comparison table, below), including:
Galvanic treatment
Neuromuscular electrical stimulation (NMES) (also known as Faradic treatment)
Micro-current electrical neuromuscular stimulation (MENS)
High-frequency treatment

Galvanic treatment
Galvanic treatment in the beauty industry has been described since at least the 1970s and earlier. Sometimes called galvanism, the treatment aims to improve the skin in two ways: (1) cleansing: a process called desincrustation, and (2) nourishing the skin condition, through an electro-chemical process  called iontophoresis  (also called ionisation). This is achieved by the application of a small, constant, direct current. The treatment works on the principle that charged ions in the skin are either attracted or repelled from the electrodes, resulting in certain chemical effects.
"Galvanism works by penetrating active substances into the subcutaneous tissues, where they act on the ineffective circulation to bring about an improvement in the vascular and lymphatic interchange in the area. This is completed in a natural and harmless way, and is aided by the actual effect of the galvanic current on the tissues. This improves the function of the cellular membrane, and allows the trapped fluid and fat to be dispersed and eliminated."
Galvanic treatment are often used on the face (facial galvanic treatment) and on the body to treat cellulite (galvanic cellulite treatments).

Faradic treatment
Faradic treatment has also been described in the beauty industry since the 1970s and earlier. The treatment tones the muscles by repeatedly contracting them with the electric current, resulting in their firming and toning, and an increase in muscular metabolism aims to remove waste products more readily. Faradic treatments are generally used on the face and body, and work by contracting muscles with a short pulse of interrupted direct current.

The treatment is also called neuromuscular electrical stimulation (NMES), and some of the manufactures who produce the equipment use their own terms, for example, Slendertone calls it electronic muscle stimulation, or the treatment is called after the name of the manufacturer, such as Ultratone or Slim Master.

Microcurrent treatment
Microcurrent treatments (MENS) have been around since the 1970s in medical applications and are distinguished by their use of micro-ampere currents (i.e. millionths of an amp) which are hardly perceptible, but mimic the body's own bio-electric currents. The treatment is designed to soften wrinkles and rejuvenate skin, including skin damaged by sunburn, acne, stretch marks, cellulite and scarring.

This increased ATP also energizes the facial muscles, similar to how exercise energizes the muscles of our bodies. Unlike anywhere else on the body, the facial muscles are directly connected to the skin, so the result of energizing the muscle is often an improved, lifted appearance. When used on the face, the treatment has become known as a "non-surgical facelift" and "facial lifting".

Microcurrent treatment works by passing a very small direct current through muscle tissue to stimulate the Golgi tendon organ.

Different microcurrent characteristics, particular the frequency and shape of the changing voltage (waveform), have different effects on the tissue.

High-frequency treatment
High-frequency treatment uses low-current high-frequency alternating currents, delivered via a glass electrode. Glass electrodes are often filled with either Neon gas which produces pink, orange, or red light or they are filled with Argon or rarefied gas which produces violet light. Because of the color of light that is produced when electricity is passed through the gas, they are inaccurately called ultraviolet or infra-red, however no UV rays or infra-red rays are produced, just visible light.  High frequency does current convert some of the oxygen in the air surrounding the electrodes into ozone, the treatment has a germicidal action, and is also drying and warming. Consequently, the treatment is used to aid healing and also to help desquamation (the skin's natural exfoliation) and stimulate sweat and sebaceous glands.   Sparking may occur when the electrode is close to the skin and then pulled away repeatedly. Some electrodes may contain a metal coil that produces a mechanical vibration, as well as sparking energy that can be felt indirectly when held in one persons hand while another person uses their hands directly on the skin. Because the effect may be pleasurable, similar devices are used in erotic electrostimulation.

Treatment and current
The characteristics of the treatment current include: (a) whether it is (direct or alternating), (b) current frequency,  (c) size of the current (all very small), and (d) the duration and shape of any pulses.

Comparison

Notes
Desincrustation – A skin cleansing process that softens and emulsifies hardened follicle sebum.
1 Amp = 1,000 milliAmps (mA) = 1,000,000 microAmps (μA)
1,000 Hz (cycles per second) = 1 kHz

Terminology

The origins of the terms "galvanic" and "Faradism" are described in the medical journal, The Lancet, in 1851. A note reads:
"We should not omit to state that Dr Duchenne closes a paper (Archives, May 1851) on the subject by these words: 'As it will be useful to create a word which should exactly point out electricity by induction, as well as its application, may it not be allowable to use the name of the philosopher who has discovered this kind of electricity? Thus, in the same way as 'Galvani' has given his name to the electricity by contact, so can we like-wise give to the electricity by induction the name of 'Faraday.' This electricity would then be called 'Faradism,' and its application 'Faradization.' Such names would establish a clear distinction between the electricity by contact and that by induction, whilst they, at the same time, render due honour to a philosopher to whom medical science owes a discovery far more valuable in a therapeutic point of view than that of Galvani.'"

It is noted that:
"Some terms such as galvanic current and faradic stimulation are unique to physiotherapy. Their definitions given in the literature are far from universal. ... The Clinical Electrophysiology  Section of the American Physical Therapy Association established a unified terminology for clinical electrical currents—that is, (a) direct current (b) alternating current (c) pulsed current (Kloth and Cummings, 1991) ... However, this terminology does not appear to have been widely adopted and inconsistencies remain in the literature".

See also
Bio-electric stimulation therapy (BEST)
Electrotherapy – the use of electricity as a medical treatment
Electrical muscle stimulation (neuromuscular electrical stimulation (NMES))
Erotic electrostimulation
Microcurrent electrical neuromuscular stimulator (MENS)
Transcutaneous electrical nerve stimulation (TENS) – the use of electric current to stimulate the nerves for therapeutic purposes

References

Bibliography
Lorraine Nordmann, Professional Beauty Therapy: The Official Guide to Level 3, 4th Edition, Publisher Cengage Learning EMEA, 2010, 496 pages. Chapter 8: "Electrical treatments"
Dawn Mernagh-Ward, Jennifer Cartwright, Health and beauty therapy: a practical approach for NVQ level 3 Edition 3, Publisher Nelson Thornes, 2004, 420 pages. Chapter 5. "Facial and Body Electrotherapy Treatments"
John Low, Ann Reed, Ann Reed (SRP.), Electrotherapy explained: principles and practice, 4th Edition, Publisher Elsevier Health Sciences, 2000, . 564 pages.
Basanta Kumar Nanda, Electrotherapy Simplified, Publisher Jaypee Brothers Publishers (2008), . 548 pages

External links
BABTAC, British Association of Beauty Therapy and Cosmetology website: Galvanic Treatments | "Galvanic Cellulite Treatments"
Electrotherapy Museum website

Cosmetics
Skin care
Electrotherapy